André Luíz Alves Santos, also known as André Gaspar (born 16 November 1972), is a Brazilian football manager and former footballer. He was winner of K League Top Assists Award and played for the title-winning club during the 2000 season.

Club career
He played for Seoul of the South Korean K League 1, then known as Anyang LG Cheetahs.

Honours

Player
Anyang LG Cheetahs
 K League 1 Winners (1): 2000
 K League 1 Runners-up (1): 2001
 Super Cup Winners (1): 2001
 Asian Club Championship Runners-up (1): 2001-02

Manager
Daegu
 Korean FA Cup Winners (1): 2018

Individual
Anyang LG Cheetahs
 K League Top Assistor Award: 2000
 K League Best XI: 2000, 2002
Daegu
 Korean FA Cup Manager Award: 2018

References

External links
 

1972 births
Living people
Association football midfielders
Brazilian footballers
Brazilian football managers
Brazilian expatriate footballers
Brazilian expatriate football managers
Brazilian expatriate sportspeople in South Korea
Brazilian expatriate sportspeople in Saudi Arabia
Expatriate football managers in Saudi Arabia
Saudi Professional League managers
Expatriate footballers in South Korea
Expatriate football managers in South Korea
Campeonato Brasileiro Série B players
Campeonato Brasileiro Série C players
K League 1 players
Campeonato Brasileiro Série B managers
Santos FC managers
Associação Atlética Portuguesa (Santos) players
Marília Atlético Clube players
FC Seoul players
Qingdao Hainiu F.C. (1990) players
Clube Atlético Bragantino players
Clube Atlético Bragantino managers
Daegu FC managers
Al-Hazm FC managers